Cavalera is a surname. Notable people with the surname include:

Max Cavalera, Brazilian heavy metal songwriter and musician, brother of Igor Cavalera
Igor Cavalera, Brazilian heavy metal drummer, brother of Max Cavalera
Nadia Cavalera, novelist, poet and literary critic
Richie Cavalera, lead singer for rock band Incite, stepson of Max Cavalera
Zyon Cavalera, drummer for rock bands Soulfly and Lody Kong, son of Max Cavalera

See also
Cavalera Conspiracy, heavy metal supergroup founded by the brothers Max and Igor in 2007